Giorgi Revazishvili (born 31 March 1977) is a retired Georgian professional football player.

External links
Career summary by playerhistory.com

1977 births
Living people
Footballers from Georgia (country)
Expatriate footballers from Georgia (country)
Expatriate footballers in Russia
Expatriate footballers in Moldova
Russian Premier League players
PFC Krylia Sovetov Samara players
Expatriate sportspeople from Georgia (country) in Moldova
FC Sheriff Tiraspol players
Georgia (country) international footballers
Association football defenders